The 1992–93 Eastern Illinois Panthers men's basketball team represented the Eastern Illinois University during the 1992–93 NCAA Division I men's basketball season. Panthers led by 13th year head coach Rick Samuels and they finished the season with the record of 10-17, 7-9.

Forward Louis Jordan was the team's leading scorer with 14.7 points and Center Darrell Young with 9.2 rebounds. Other statistical leaders included guard Derrick Landrus with 3.3 assists.

Schedule

|-
!colspan=12 style=| Mid-Con Tournament

References 

Eastern Illinois Panthers men's basketball seasons
Eastern Illinois Panthers men's basket
Eastern Illinois Panthers men's basket
Eastern Illinois